Marc-André Grondin (born March 11, 1984) is a Canadian actor, known for his role as Xavier Laflamme in the 2011 ice hockey film Goon. He also played Zachary Beaulieu in Jean-Marc Vallée's film C.R.A.Z.Y. (2005), for which he won a Jutra Award for best actor. He was born in Montreal, Quebec.

Career
Grondin is known for his work in the film Les fleurs magiques, La belle bête, 5150 Elm's Way, Che and the television series Les super mamies, Sous un ciel variable and Nos étés. Grondin received a César in 2009 for his performance as Raphael in Le Premier Jour du Reste de ta Vie directed by Rémi Bezançon.

He played Frederic Bourdin, a French serial impostor, in the 2010 film The Chameleon, as well as French-Canadian hockey player "Xavier LaFlamme" in Goon (2011).

He was nominated for Best Actor at the 8th Canadian Screen Awards for his performance in Mafia Inc..

In other work, Grondin has served as a judge at the 2010 Festival du Nouveau Cinéma awards.

Filmography

Film

Television

Awards and nominations

References

External links

 

1984 births
20th-century Canadian male actors
21st-century Canadian male actors
Canadian male film actors
Canadian male television actors
Canadian male voice actors
French Quebecers
Living people
Male actors from Montreal
Most Promising Actor César Award winners
Best Actor Jutra and Iris Award winners